TFP may stand for:

Concepts 

 Tailored fiber placement
 Thin filament pyrometry
 Thin film polarizer
 Time for print
 Total factor productivity
 Total functional programming
 Transference focused psychotherapy
 Tapered floating point
 Trust framework policy
 Travaux Forcés à Perpetuité, French for "hard labour for life", as stated in Les Misérables by Victor Hugo

Organisations 

 Tradition, Family and Property
 American Society for the Defense of Tradition, Family and Property
 Terry Farrell and Partners
 Taiwan Farmers' Party, a political party in Taiwan
 The Food Project
 Tobacco-Free Portfolios

Products 
 Trifluoperazine
 Transformers: Prime